StAR related lipid transfer domain containing 3 (STARD3) is a protein that in humans is encoded by the STARD3 gene. STARD3 also known as metastatic lymph node 64 protein (MLN64) is a late endosomal integral membrane protein involved in cholesterol transport. STARD3 creates membrane contact sites between the endoplasmic reticulum (ER) and late endosomes where it moves cholesterol.

Function 

This gene encodes a member of a subfamily of lipid trafficking proteins that are characterized by a C-terminal steroidogenic acute regulatory domain and an N-terminal metastatic lymph node 64 domain. The encoded protein localizes to the membranes of late endosomes and may be involved in exporting cholesterol. Alternative splicing results in multiple transcript variants.[provided by RefSeq, Oct 2009].

STARD3 is involved in cholesterol transport from the ER to late endosomes where the protein is anchored.  It forms a complex with fellow late endosomal protein STARD3 N-terminal-like protein (STARD3NL) also known as MLN64 N-terminal homologue (MENTHO) and ER VAMP-associated proteins (VAP proteins) A and B (VAP-A, VAP-B) to tether the two organelles together.  For STARD3, this interaction is regulated by phosphorylation of a serine in its FFAT motif.

The closest homolog to STARD3 is the steroidogenic acute regulatory protein (StAR/StarD1), which initiates the production of steroids by moving cholesterol inside the mitochondrion.  Thus, MLN64 is also proposed to move cholesterol inside the mitochondria under certain conditions to initiate StAR-independent steroidogenesis, such as in the human placenta which lacks StAR yet produces steroids. This functional role is supported by evidence that MLN64 expression can stimulate steroid production in a model cell system.

One study indicates that this protein also specifically binds lutein in the retina.

Structure 
STARD3 is a multi-domain protein composed of a N-terminal MENTAL (MLN64 N-terminal) domain, a central phospho-FFAT motif (two phenylalanines in an acidic tract), and a C-terminal StAR-related transfer domain (START) lipid transport domain.

The MENTAL domain of STARD3 is similar to the protein STARD3 N-terminal like protein (STARD3NL) also known as MLN64 N-terminal homologue (MENTHO).  This domain is composed of 4 transmembrane helices which anchor the protein in the limiting membrane of late endosomes. This domain binds cholesterol and associates with the same domain in STARD3NL.

The phospho-FFAT motif is a short protein sequence motif which binds to the ER proteins VAP-A, VAP-B and MOSPD2 proteins after phosphorylation.

The START domain of STARD3 is homologous to the StAR protein. X-ray crystallography of the C-terminus indicates that this domain forms a pocket that can bind cholesterol.  This places STARD3 within the StarD1/D3 subfamily of START domain-containing proteins.

Tissue distribution 
STARD3 is expressed in all tissues in the body at various levels.  In the brain, MLN64 is detectable in many but not all cells. Many malignant tumors highly express STARD3 as a result of its gene being part of a Her2/erbB2-containing gene locus that is amplified.

Pathology 
Loss of STARD3 has little effect in mice. At the cellular level, changes in STARD3 can disrupt trafficking of endosomes and cause accumulation of cholesterol in late endosomes.

References

Further reading